Jonthonota is a genus of tortoise beetles in the family Chrysomelidae. There are at least two described species in Jonthonota.

Species
These two species belong to the genus Jonthonota:
 Jonthonota mexicana (Champion, 1894)
 Jonthonota nigripes (Olivier, 1790) (blacklegged tortoise beetle)

References

Further reading

 
 
 
 

Cassidinae
Articles created by Qbugbot